Blood & Lemonade is the fifth studio album by American rock band American Hi-Fi. It was released on September 9, 2014, through Rude Records. It was released four years apart from their previous album, Fight the Frequency. The first single released was "Allison", issued in the summer of 2014. The second single is "Golden State".

Track listing

Personnel
American Hi-Fi
 Stacy Jones - lead vocals, guitar
 Jamie Arentzen - guitar, backing vocals
 Drew Parsons - bass, backing vocals
 Brian Nolan - drums, backing vocals

Production
 John Fields - Engineer
 Craig Frank - Additional Engineer
 Paul David Hager - Mixing
 Howie Weinsberg - Mastering

References

American Hi-Fi albums
2014 albums